In observational astronomy, the observation arc (or arc length) of a Solar System body is the time period between its earliest and latest observations, used for tracing the body's path. It is usually given in days or years. The term is mostly used in the discovery and tracking of asteroids and comets. Arc length has the greatest influence on the accuracy of an orbit. The number, spacing of intermediate observations, and timestamps have a lesser effect.

Short arcs 
A very short arc leaves a high uncertainty parameter. The object might be in one of many different orbits, at many distances from Earth. In some cases, the initial arc was too short to determine if the object was in orbit around the Earth, or orbiting out in the asteroid belt. With a 1-day observation arc,  was thought to be a trans-Neptunian dwarf planet, but is now known to be a 1 km main-belt asteroid. With an observation arc of 3 days,  was thought to be a Mars-crossing asteroid that could be a threat to Earth, but was later found to be another main-belt asteroid.

A relatively modest observation arc may allow finding an older "precovery" photo, providing a much longer arc and a more precise orbit.

An observation arc less than 30 days can make it difficult to recover an Inner Solar System object more than a year after the last observation, and may result in a lost minor planet. Due to their greater distance from the Sun and slow movement across the sky, trans-Neptunian objects with observation arcs less than several years often have poorly constrained orbits.

As a general rule objects discovered when they are currently farther from the Sun will have greater uncertainties in their initial orbits if the observation arcs are short.

 which was discovered when 100+ AU from the Sun and has only been observed 9 times over 2 years will require an observation arc of several years to refine the uncertainties in the orbital period and aphelion (farthest distance from the Sun).

 with only 4 observations over 1 day has uncertainties so large that the error bars are not really meaningful and just show that the uncertainties are very large. On its discovery date  is estimated to have been  from Earth.

Oort cloud comet C/2017 K2 was announced when it had a short 2.6 day observation arc, was estimated to be  from the Sun, and was estimated to come to perihelion around 10 AU from the Sun in 2027. But it is now known that C/2017 K2 was discovered when it was 16 AU from the Sun and will come to perihelion 1.8 AU from the Sun on 19 December 2022.

It took an observation arc of about 200 days to rule out a Mars impact by Oort cloud comet C/2013 A1 (Siding Spring).

Interstellar objects 
Interstellar objects generally require an observation arc of 2–3 weeks using hundreds of observations to confirm that an interloper has a hyperbolic excess velocity (interstellar speed) of more than a few km/s. Comet C/1999 U2 (SOHO) with an almost meaningless observation arc of 1 day shows a very dubious interstellar speed of 17 km/s, but could easily have a closed orbit with an eccentricity as low as 0.7.

Earth approaches 

With an observation arc of 257 years, the uncertainty in Comet Swift–Tuttle's closest approach to Earth on 5 August 2126 is about ±10 thousand km. With an observation arc of ~1 year, the uncertainty in 's closest approach to Earth on 23 March 2147 is about ±2 million km. Even though C/1991 L3 (Levy) has a longer observation arc than C/2001 OG108, it has significantly fewer observations which generates a greater uncertainty.

In contrast, comet C/2022 A1 (Sarneczky) was discovered on 2 January 2022 when it was 1.3 AU from the Sun, and announced on 7 January 2022 with only a 5-day observation arc. It made its closest Earth approach the next day with a 3-sigma uncertainty region of ±1 million km. The large uncertainty was a result of the short arc and discovery distance.

See also 
 
 Precovery
 Uncertainty parameter U

References

External links 
 How to determine the orbit of a comet? (ESA 7 March 2014)
   
   

Asteroids
Observational astronomy
Orbits